Trechus beatus is a species of ground beetle in the subfamily Trechinae. It was described by Reitter in 1903.

References

beatus
Beetles described in 1903